The enzyme N-acetylneuraminate lyase catalyzes the chemical reaction

N-acetylneuraminate  N-acetyl-D-mannosamine + pyruvate

This enzyme belongs to the family of lyases, specifically the oxo-acid-lyases, which cleave carbon-carbon bonds.  The systematic name of this enzyme class is N-acetylneuraminate pyruvate-lyase (N-acetyl-D-mannosamine-forming). Other names in common use include N-acetylneuraminic acid aldolase, acetylneuraminate lyase, sialic aldolase, sialic acid aldolase, sialate lyase, N-acetylneuraminic aldolase, neuraminic aldolase, N-acetylneuraminate aldolase, neuraminic acid aldolase, N-acetylneuraminic acid aldolase, neuraminate aldolase, N-acetylneuraminic lyase, N-acetylneuraminic acid lyase, NPL, NALase, NANA lyase, acetylneuraminate pyruvate-lyase, and N-acetylneuraminate pyruvate-lyase.  This enzyme participates in aminosugars metabolism.

Structural studies

References

 
 

EC 4.1.3
Enzymes of known structure